The Chiola is a small coastal stream in the department of Haute-Corse, Corsica, France.
It enters the Tyrrhenian Sea from the east of the island.

Course

It rises to the north of the  Punta Mozza and flows east-northeast, and then east, through the Foret Territoriale de Tova.
It runs under the T10 coastal highway and enters the sea to the south of the Marine de Solaro resort.
The Plage Chiola, a beach, extends south from the mouth of the stream.
Its course is south of the Travo and north of the Solenzara.

Tributaries

The following streams (ruisseaux) are tributaries of the Chiola (ordered by length):
 Arjaja: 
 Capicoli: 
 Petra Gialla: 
 Ori: 
 Licciola:

Notes

Sources

Rivers of Haute-Corse
Rivers of France
Coastal basins of the Tyrrhenian Sea in Corsica